Ekaterine Gorgodze was the defending champion, but chose to participate at the 2019 Bucharest Open instead.

Marie Bouzková won the title, defeating Natalija Kostić in the final, 6–3, 6–3.

Seeds

Draw

Finals

Top half

Bottom half

References

External Links
Main Draw

President's Cup (tennis) - Singles
2019 Women's Singles